Ratan Shahar railway station is a railway station in Jhunjhunu district, Rajasthan. Its code is RSH. It serves Ratan Shahar. The station consists of two platforms. Passenger express trains halt here.

Trains

The following trains halt at Ratan Shahar railway station in both directions:

 Delhi Sarai Rohilla–Sikar Express

References

Railway stations in Jhunjhunu district
Jaipur railway division